Jokke Kangaskorpi (2 March 1972 – 1 May 2009) was a Finnish professional footballer who played as a winger.

He played for the Finnish clubs MP Mikkeli, FC Haka, TPV and KTP making 244 Veikkausliiga appearances. With FC Haka he became Finnish league champion in 1995. He also played for Gefle IF, Lira Luleå BK, and IFK Gävle in Sweden, and was capped 11 times for Finland.

References

1972 births
2009 deaths
Association football wingers
Finnish footballers
Finland international footballers
Mikkelin Palloilijat players
FC Haka players
Gefle IF players
Tampereen Pallo-Veikot players
Kotkan Työväen Palloilijat players
Veikkausliiga players
Finnish expatriate footballers
Expatriate footballers in Sweden
People from Mikkeli
Sportspeople from South Savo